Onuf is a surname. Notable people with the surname include:

Bronislaw Onuf-Onufrowicz (1863–1928), Russian-born American neurologist
Nicholas Onuf (born 1941), American international relations scholar
Peter S. Onuf, American historian and professor

See also
Onuf's nucleus